Milica Mandić (born 6 December 1991) is a Serbian taekwondo athlete. She is a two-time Olympic champion in the +67 kg category, as well as World champion in the same category.

Career 
Mandić won a bronze medal in the middleweight category (under 73 kg) at the 2011 World Taekwondo Championships and a silver medal at the 2012 European Taekwondo Championships. 
At the 2012 Summer Olympics she beat Anne-Caroline Graffe of France in a 9–7 win, becoming the first gold medalist for independent Serbia.

At the 2016 Summer Olympics she was eliminated in quarterfinals by British Bianca Walkden. At 2017 World Taekwondo Championships she won gold medal, beating South Korean Oh Hye-ri. In April 2020, she announced that she will retire after the 2020 Summer Olympics. At the 2020 Summer Olympics, which were held one year later due to COVID-19 pandemic, she won her second gold medal (first for Serbia in Tokyo 2020) against South Korean Lee Da-bin.

Hall of Fame 
Mandić and her trainer Dragan Jović were included in the Taekwondo Hall of Fame at the 2013 Ceremony in Las Vegas. She was selected because of her great contribution to the sport in Serbia. Her results, including the gold medal in the 2012 Summer Olympics in London was the highest result in the region.

Personal life
She is a big fan of KK Partizan.

References

External links

Milica won medal at World Championship-article in Serbian
Milica won medal at European championship-article in Serbian
London Olympics 2012
 

1991 births
Living people
Sportspeople from Belgrade
Serbian female taekwondo practitioners
Olympic taekwondo practitioners of Serbia
Taekwondo practitioners at the 2012 Summer Olympics
Olympic medalists in taekwondo
Olympic gold medalists for Serbia
Medalists at the 2012 Summer Olympics
Taekwondo practitioners at the 2015 European Games
European Games medalists in taekwondo
European Games silver medalists for Serbia
Taekwondo practitioners at the 2016 Summer Olympics
Mediterranean Games silver medalists for Serbia
Competitors at the 2013 Mediterranean Games
Mediterranean Games medalists in taekwondo
European Taekwondo Championships medalists
World Taekwondo Championships medalists
Taekwondo practitioners at the 2020 Summer Olympics
Medalists at the 2020 Summer Olympics
21st-century Serbian women